Lycopene β-cyclase (CrtL, CrtL-b, CrtY) is an enzyme with systematic name carotenoid beta-end group lyase (decyclizing). This enzyme catalyses the following chemical reaction

 carotenoid ψ-end group  carotenoid β-end group

This enzyme requires NAD(P)H. It converts Lycopene (2 ψ ends) into β-carotene (2 β ends).

References

External links 
 

EC 5.5.1